The Gujarat State Fertilizer Corporation Ground is a cricket ground in Vadodara, India. The first recorded match on the ground was during the 1971/72 cricket season. It held fifteen Ranji Trophy matches between 1972 and 2003, all featuring Baroda. This included the final of the 2000–01 Ranji Trophy tournament. More recently it held three Twenty20 matches in the 2016–17 Inter State Twenty-20 Tournament.

See also
 List of cricket grounds in India

References

External links
Gujarat State Fertilizer Corporation Ground at CricketArchive

Cricket grounds in Gujarat
1972 establishments in Gujarat
Sport in Vadodara
Sports venues completed in 1972
20th-century architecture in India